Brevianthaceae is a family of liverworts belonging to the order Jungermanniales.

Genera:
 Brevianthus J.J.Engel & R.M.Schust.
 Tetracymbaliella Grolle

References

Jungermanniales
Liverwort families